Alvaro Yelvington "Bud" McCallum (February 19, 1900 – March 26, 1977) was an American football player, coach of football and basketball, and college athletics administrator. He served as the head football coach at Texas College of Arts and Industries—now known as Texas A&M University–Kingsville–from 1929 to 1941, compiling a record of 71–34–9. McCallum was also the head basketball coach at Texas A&I from 1929 to 1940, tallying a mark of 92–119, and the school's athletic director from 1929 to 1941.

As a college football player, McCallum was an All-Southwest Conference end for the University of Texas–Austin in 1920. He was the son of women's suffrage activist Jane Y. McCallum.

Head coaching record

College football

References

1900 births
1977 deaths
American football ends
Basketball coaches from Texas
Texas Longhorns football players
Texas A&M–Kingsville Javelinas athletic directors
Texas A&M–Kingsville Javelinas football coaches
Texas A&M–Kingsville Javelinas men's basketball coaches
High school football coaches in Texas
Players of American football from Texas